American Airlines Flight 1, dubbed "the New Yorker", was a regularly scheduled passenger flight. On October 30, 1941, when the route was a multiple stop flight from La Guardia Airport to Chicago Municipal Airport with intermediate stops at Newark, New Jersey; Buffalo, New York; Detroit, Michigan; and South Bend, Indiana, on the flight's leg between Buffalo and Detroit, the American Airlines Douglas DC-3-277B operating the route, on the flight's leg between Buffalo and Detroit, crashed into a wheat field approximately one half mile east of the town of Lawrence Station, Ontario, southwest of London. All aboard, including 17 passengers and 3 crew, were killed. It was the second of three fatal crashes during an operation of American Airlines Flight 1.

Accident
At 9:07 p.m., the plane departed from Buffalo. When the plane arrived near the area where the accident occurred, the plane started to descend, circled to the right and banked normally for the radius and speed of the turns. The diameter of the initial circle was approximately 1-1/2 miles; thereafter during the descent the radius progressively diminished. After completing approximately four circles, the airplane recovered from the spiral in close proximity to the ground, climbed suddenly to an altitude of about 200 to 500 feet and may had stalled. It then dived to the ground, striking in a nose-down attitude at an angle of approximately 70 degrees with the horizontal, and immediately burst into flames. Everyone onboard was killed.

Cause
The probable cause of the crash was not determined in the published Civil Aeronautics Board accident report.

Memorial 
At the crash site, a plaque was erected on 10 September 2018 by Ray Lunn of the Southwold SS12 school committee, with help from the Green Lane Community Trust and the Southwold Township History Committee, to outline the events that unfolded in that accident and remember the victims of the accident.

Notes

References

External links 
 Final report of the Civil Aeronautics Board (PDF)
 CBC News – Commemorating the 1941 crash of the Flagship Erie.

Airliner accidents and incidents in Canada
Airliner accidents and incidents with an unknown cause
Aviation accidents and incidents in the United States in 1941
Accidents and incidents involving the Douglas DC-3
1941 in Ontario